SpongeBob vs. The Big One: Beach Party Cook-Off is a 2009 SpongeBob SquarePants video game developed by The Fizz Factor and published by Play THQ. In the European Union, the game is known as SpongeBob SquarePants: Frantic Fry-Cook. It was announced on January 12, 2009 by THQ Inc. that the game was being developed and was going to release later that year. It is based on the episode SpongeBob SquarePants vs. The Big One. The game was released on March 3, 2009, the same day as the episode's DVD release.

Plot 
Both Mr. Krabs and Plankton want to cook for Jack Kahuna Laguna's beach party. Since they can't come to an agreement, Jack demands a competition to see which cook is the best. The winner would get to serve their food at the party. SpongeBob is adamant on the Krusty Krab winning but he needs help since they don't have much staff. Plankton's cousins want to help him, but since he won't pay them anything, SpongeBob recruits them and tells them that Mr. Krabs will pay if they want to help him in the competition throughout the game, players will play through 5 "Episodes", each with a new judge after every 3 workdays, and a new theme for the Krusty Krab. The player will then need to help SpongeBob train a group of Plankton's cousins to become the best chefs in Bikini Bottom. Throughout the game, the player helps SpongeBob and his friends train them to cook multiple foods like the Krabby Patty, Fried Seaweed Sandwiches, and many more. The player works on a daily schedule to serve a number of customers before being done for the day. Each customer asks for certain orders that players must fulfill by performing several mini-games related to the dish. High-scoring dishes receive larger tips, which can be used to buy more recipes or skills for the plankton helpers.

Gameplay 
The game consists of cooking mini-games, similar to Cooking Mama, and restaurant management. The player oversees the staff of Planktons as they work to fill the orders of the day. Occasionally, the player will be asked to help a Plankton complete a task by playing a mini-game representing a cooking activity. In all, there are 25 different mini-games that are used to represent tasks like slicing, stirring, whisking, and garnishing. The game also has a multiplayer mode, in which the player who prepares the dish in the least amount of time is the winner. While the Planktons do most of the work during the regular shifts, challenges where the player must prepare an entire recipe on their own are unlocked after a few shifts. The player can also buy new recipes, manage the menu, and decorate the restaurant.

References 

THQ games
2009 video games
Cooking video games
Nintendo DS games
Nintendo DS-only games
SpongeBob SquarePants video games
Video games developed in the United States
Multiplayer and single-player video games
The Fizz Factor games